Microcosm was a hypermedia system, originally developed in 1988 by the Department of Electronics and Computer Science at the University of Southampton, with a small team of researchers in the Computer Science group: Wendy Hall, Andrew Fountain, Hugh Davis and Ian Heath. The system pre-dates the web and builds on early hypermedia systems, such as Ted Nelson's Project Xanadu and work of Douglas Engelbart. And like Intermedia or Hyper-G, which were other hypermedia systems created around the same time, Microcosm stores links between documents in a separate database.

See also 
 Xanadu
 Intermedia
 Hyper-G (or HyperWave)

References

External links 
 Microcosm page from W3C Historical Archives
 Microcosm: an open hypermedia system (1992): Hugh Davis's video demonstration of Microcosm hypermedia features from University of Southampton
 Microcosm in Vision and Reality of Hypertext and Graphical User Interfaces

Computer-related introductions in 1988
History of computing in the United Kingdom
Hypermedia
Science and technology in Hampshire
University of Southampton